This is a list of events in Scottish television from 1978.

Events
14 April – Debut of the BBC Scotland series The Beechgrove Garden.
3 July – The final edition of the Scottish politics programme Public Account is broadcast on BBC1 Scotland. 
Scottish Television airs a seven-part adaptation of The Prime of Miss Jean Brodie.
 Scotland Today’s annual summer break is scrapped. Consequently, the programme is now on air all year round.
Grampian Television becomes the first British television station to adopt ENG video cameras for news coverage. This move finally allows its regional news programme, Grampian Today, to extend from three to five nights a week. Grampian also develops its own outside broadcast unit, initially using studio equipment.

Debuts

BBC
14 April - The Beechgrove Garden on BBC 1 (1978–Present)
April - The Standard on BBC 1 (1978)
30 September - Scotch and Wry on BBC 1 (1978–92)

ITV
Unknown - The Prime of Miss Jean Brodie (1978)

Television series
Scotsport (1957–2008)
Reporting Scotland (1968–1983; 1984–present)
Top Club (1971–1998)
Scotland Today (1972–2009)
Sportscene (1975–Present)
Garnock Way (1976–1979)

Ending this year
Public Account (1976–1978)

Births
14 April - Michelle Duncan, actress
15 September - David Sneddon, singer and musician
10 December - Gordon Chree, broadcast journalist

See also
1978 in Scotland

References

 
Television in Scotland by year
1970s in Scottish television